American Grit is an American reality television series that premiered on Fox on April 14, 2016. The series stars WWE wrestler John Cena. Fox ordered ten episodes for the first season of the competition series. On July 29, 2016, Fox renewed the series for a second season, which premiered on Sunday, June 11, 2017.

Premise 
Competitors are divided into four teams of four, each led by a military veteran who is designated as the team's Cadre and compete in a series of Team Challenges. All members of the winning team are safe from elimination and advance to the next round, while a member of each losing team is chosen to participate in an Elimination Challenge. The elimination continues until one contestant quits, fails the challenge, or becomes physically unable to continue, at which point he or she is eliminated from the competition. Eliminated competitors ring a ship's bell on the site before departing, after the tradition of Navy SEAL trainees "ringing out" if they choose to withdraw from the program. In the finale, the remaining competitors take part in an elimination challenge that concludes with a winner being named and receiving a $250,000 cash prize.

Filmed at the foothills of Mount Rainier in Eatonville, Washington, the first season focuses on "pushing teams to the brink" and features 16 contestants with a variety of fitness backgrounds. Competitors who lose during Team Challenges, called "Evolutions", are selected by their own Cadre to participate in the Elimination Challenge. As long as a team has at least two members, a contestant cannot be sent to two consecutive Elimination Challenges. The Elimination Challenge begins with an obstacle course, called "The Circus", followed by an endurance test. The obstacle course remains constant, but the endurance test differs in each episode. The endurance test begins once all three participants have completed the obstacle course, with the first- and second-place finishers receiving an advantage over the third-place finisher, and concludes with the elimination of one competitor. The season finale features an extended Circus where all remaining contestants must participate. This Circus lasts until all members of three teams have dropped out, at which point the remaining members of the last team win $250,000 each. The season was won by Clare Painter and Mark Bouquin of Team Noah.

Taking place in Hampton Island, Georgia in a location referred to as "Camp Grit", the second season focuses on "helping competitors find their grit" and features contestants "who either have lost their grit or never had it". 17 competitors appear at the start of the competition, one of whom is eliminated before the teams are formed. The Cadre of the winning team chooses the members of the losing teams who will be sent to the Elimination Challenge and consecutive appearances are allowed. Only an endurance test is featured in the Elimination Challenge and no advantages are provided to its participants. Depending on the Elimination Challenge, it concludes with one or two contestants being eliminated. The competition eventually becomes contestant-based, with all remaining competitors ultimately competing against each other and only one winner being named. Winning the second season was Gigi Gustin of Team Grady.

Season 1

Cadre 
 Rorke Denver, a US Navy SEAL Commander who led assault teams worldwide. He also starred in Act of Valor.
 Noah Galloway, a US Army member of the 502nd Infantry and 101st Airborne Division, awarded the Purple Heart when he lost his left arm and left leg in a roadside bomb attack
 Tawanda "Tee" Hanible, a US Marine Corps Gunnery Sergeant
 Nicholas "Nick" Irving, a US Army sniper with the 3rd Ranger Battalion with 33 confirmed kills, nicknamed "The Reaper"

Contestants 
The contestants of Season 1 range in age from 22 to 54.

Contestant progress 

Color key

Episodes

Ratings

Season 2

Cadre 
 John Burk, a US Army Infantry Drill Sergeant who served in Iraq and Afghanistan and also trained younger soldiers for battle, now an entrepreneur
 Riki Long, a US Marine who was in charge of the legal administration at the largest Marine Corps personnel center, now a fitness nutrition specialist and weightlifter
 Chloe Mondesir, a US Marine Ammunition Technician, now working with a non-profit organization to raise money for Veteran Affairs programs
 Grady Powell, a US Army Green Beret with the 10th Special Forces Group with tours in Iraq and Africa, now runs a firearms training facility.  He also won NBC's reality television program Stars Earn Stripes alongside former WWE Divas Champion Eve Torres.

Contestants 
The second season contains 17 contestants, ranging in age from 20 to 48.

George was originally on Team Grady, but later became a member of Team Burk.

Contestant progress 
Color key

Episodes

Ratings

References 

General references

External links 

 
 

Fox Broadcasting Company original programming
2010s American reality television series
2016 American television series debuts
2017 American television series endings
English-language television shows
Television shows set in Washington (state)
Television shows set in Georgia (U.S. state)